Ford Falcon is an automobile nameplate applied to several vehicles worldwide. 

 Ford Falcon (North America), an automobile produced by Ford  from 1960 to 1970.
 Ford Falcon (Argentina), a car built by Ford Argentina from 1962 until 1991.
 Ford Falcon (Australia), a car manufactured by Ford Australia from 1960 to 2016. 
 Ford Falcon van, a passenger variant of the first generation Ford E Series van (based on the Falcon platform) produced by Ford in the 1960s.

Falcon